The 2021 Africa Cup of Nations was an international football tournament that was held in Cameroon from 9 January to 6 February 2022. The 24 national teams involved in the tournament were allowed to register a squad of up to 28 players, including a minimum of three goalkeepers, to allow teams to deal with any COVID-19 cases. Only players in these squads were eligible to take part in the tournament.

The position and date of birth listed for each player is per the official squad list published by CAF. The age listed for each player is on 9 January 2022, the first day of the tournament. The numbers of caps and goals listed for each player do not include any matches played after the start of tournament. The club listed is the club for which the player last played a competitive match prior to the tournament. The nationality for each club reflects the national association (not the league) to which the club is affiliated. A flag is included for coaches that are of a different nationality than their own national team.

Group A

Burkina Faso
Coach: Kamou Malo

A 29-man provisional squad was announced on 24 December 2021. The final 28-man squad was named on 4 January 2022.

Cameroon
Coach:  Toni Conceição

A 40-man provisional squad was announced on 10 December 2021. A 28-man final squad was announced on 22 December 2021.

Cape Verde
Coach: Bubista

A 26-man final squad was announced on 23 December 2021.  On 3 January 2022, Delmiro and Elber Evora were added to the squad to reach the maximum of 28 players. On 7 January 2022, Djaniny withdrew due to injury and was replaced by Vagner Gonçalves.

Ethiopia
Coach: Wubetu Abate

A 25-man final squad was announced on 24 December 2021.

Group B

Guinea
Coach: Kaba Diawara

A 27-man final squad was announced on 22 December 2021. On 26 December 2021, Antoine Conte and Florentin Pogba withdrew due to injury and were replaced by Fodé Camara and Gaoussou Youssouf Siby.

Malawi
Coach:  Mario Marinică

A 43-man provisional squad, including 13 standby players, was announced on 22 December 2021. A 23-man final squad was announced on 1 January 2022. Additionally to the squad named for the tournament, 5 players (Stain Davie, Paul Ndhlovu, Gerald Phiri Jr., Brighton Munthali, and Daniel Austin Chimbalanga) were named as reserves and will be available in case of eventualities.

Senegal
Coach: Aliou Cissé

A 27-man final squad was announced on 25 December 2021. Alioune Badara Faty was later added to the squad to reach the maximum of 28 players.

Zimbabwe
Coach: Norman Mapeza

A 30-man provisional squad was announced on 21 December 2021. A 23-man final squad was announced on 29 December 2021. Panashe Mutimbanyoka, Bill Antonio and Temptation Chiwunga were also registered for the tournament but did not travel to Cameroon.

Group C

Comoros
Coach:  Amir Abdou

A 26-man final squad was announced on 23 December 2021. Following the squad announcement, Alexis Souahy and Ibroihim Djoudja were added to the squad to reach the maximum of 28 players.

Gabon
Coach:  Patrice Neveu

A 30-man provisional squad was announced on 18 December 2021.

Ghana
Coach:  Milovan Rajevac

A 30-man provisional squad was announced on 21 December 2021. A 28-man final squad was named on 3 January 2022.

Morocco
Coach:  Vahid Halilhodžić

A 25-man final squad was announced on 23 December 2021. On 28 December 2021, Badr Benoun, Mohamed Chibi, and Soufiane Rahimi  were added to the squad to reach the maximum of 28 players. On 30 December 2021, Anas Zniti withdrew due to injury and was replaced by Ahmed Reda Tagnaouti. On 10 January 2022, Badr Benoun withdrew due to injury and was replaced by Achraf Bencharki.

Group D

Egypt
Coach:  Carlos Queiroz

A 40-man provisional squad was announced on 19 December 2021. A 25-man final squad was announced on 29 December 2021. On the next day, Ibrahim Adel, Marwan Hamdy and Mohamed Hamdy were added to the squad to reach the maximum of 28 players. On 7 January 2022, Mohamed Hamdy withdrew from the squad due to a knee injury and was replaced by Marwan Dawoud.

Guinea-Bissau
Coach: Baciro Candé

A 24-man final squad was announced on 30 December 2021.

Nigeria
Interim coach: Augustine Eguavoen

A 28-man final squad was announced on 25 December 2021. On 31 December 2021, Emmanuel Dennis, Victor Osimhen, Leon Balogun, and Shehu Abdullahi withdrew from the squad and were replaced by Semi Ajayi, Tyronne Ebuehi, Peter Olayinka, and Henry Onyekuru. On 6 January 2022, Odion Ighalo withdrawn from the squad, thus reducing the squad to 27 players. Newly appointed coach José Peseiro joined the team as an observer, while interim coach Eguavoen led the team.

Sudan
Coach: Burhan Tia

A 34-man provisional squad was announced on 27 December 2021. A 28-man final squad was announced on 5 January 2022.

Group E

Algeria
Coach: Djamel Belmadi

A 28-man final squad was announced on 24 December 2021.

Equatorial Guinea
Coach: Juan Micha

A 28-man final squad was announced on 27 December 2021. On 4 January 2022, Aitor Embela withdrew due to injury and was replaced by Felipe Ovono.

Ivory Coast
Coach:  Patrice Beaumelle

A 28-man final squad was announced on 23 December 2021. On 31 December 2021, Sylvain Gbohouo was temporarily banned by FIFA, due to being found guilty of taking the prohibited substance trimetazidine and could not participate. A few days later, N'Drin Ulrich Edan was called up to replace him.

Sierra Leone
Coach: John Keister

A 40-man provisional squad was announced on 21 December 2021. A 28-man final squad was announced on 31 December 2021. On 8 January 2022, Alhassan Koroma withdrew due to injury and was replaced by Augustus Kargbo.

Group F

Gambia
Coach:  Tom Saintfiet

A 40-man provisional squad was announced on 11 December 2021. A 28-man final squad was announced on 21 December 2021.

Mali
Coach: Mohamed Magassouba

A 28-man final squad was announced on 27 December 2021.

Mauritania
Coach:  Didier Gomes Da Rosa

A 30-man provisional squad was announced on 23 December 2021. A 28-man final squad was announced on 31 December 2021.

Tunisia
Coach: Mondher Kebaier

A 28-man final squad was announced on 30 December 2021. On 4 January 2022, it was announced that Youssef Msakni and Seifeddine Jaziri tested positive for COVID-19, but the Tunisian Football Federation were not allowed to replace them ahead of the tournament. On 5 January 2022, Firas Ben Larbi withdrew due to injury and was replaced by Issam Jebali.

Player representation

By age
Oldest:  Marco Soares
Youngest:  Beyatt Lekweiry

Goalkeepers
Oldest:  Abdoul Karim Cissé
Youngest:  Ibrahim Sesay

Captains
Oldest:  Jimmy Abdou
Youngest:  Naby Keïta

By club
Clubs with 5 or more players represented are listed.

By club nationality

By club confederation

By representatives of domestic league

References

External links

2021
Squads